Noblesse Oblige is the ninth studio album by the Italian band Punkreas, released in 2012.

Track listing
 La fine del mondo
 Polenta & Kebab
 Mozzarella Blu
 Il segreto di Pulcinella
 Ali di Pietra
 Giuda
 L'aperitivo
 Sesso a Pagamento
 La soluzione
 Plastico
 Astronauta
 Saremo in tanti

References

2012 albums
Punkreas albums
Edel AG albums